Elijah Esaias Holyfield (born November 30, 1997) is an American football running back for the Cincinnati Bengals of the National Football League (NFL). He played college football at Georgia. He is the son of former heavyweight world champion boxer Evander Holyfield.

Early years
Holyfield attended high school at Riverside Military Academy in Gainesville, GA  and Woodward Academy in College Park, Georgia. As a junior, he rushed for 1,735 yards and 25 touchdowns and as a senior he rushed for 1,069 yards and 21 touchdowns. He was ranked as a 4-star recruit coming out of high school. He committed to the University of Georgia to play college football.

College career
Holyfield played in five games as a true freshman at Georgia in 2016, rushing six times for 29 yards. As a sophomore in 2017, he rushed for 293 yards on 50 carries and two touchdowns. Splitting time with D'Andre Swift in 2018, Holyfield rushed for 1,018 yards on 159 carries with seven touchdowns. After the season, Holyfield decided to forgo his senior year to pursue a career in the NFL.

Professional career

Carolina Panthers
Following the conclusion of the 2019 NFL Draft, Holyfield signed with the Carolina Panthers as an undrafted free agent on April 29, 2019. He was waived on September 1, 2019 and was re-signed to the practice squad.

Philadelphia Eagles
After his contract expired with the Panthers, Holyfield was signed to the Philadelphia Eagles active roster on December 31, 2019, ahead of their wild card game against the Seahawks. He was waived on September 3, 2020, and re-signed to the team's practice squad three days later. He was elevated to the active roster on November 21 for the team's week 11 game against the Cleveland Browns, and reverted to the practice squad after the game. He signed a reserve/future contract with the Eagles on January 4, 2021.

On August 29, 2021, Holyfield was waived by the Eagles.

Cincinnati Bengals
On October 12, 2021, Holyfield was signed to the Cincinnati Bengals practice squad.

On February 15, 2022, Holyfield signed a reserve/future contract.

On July 28, 2022, he was placed on injured reserve after suffering a significant knee injury during team practice the day before.

Personal life
He is the son of former professional boxer Evander Holyfield.

References

External links
Georgia Bulldogs bio

1997 births
Living people
Sportspeople from College Park, Georgia
Players of American football from Georgia (U.S. state)
American football running backs
Georgia Bulldogs football players
Carolina Panthers players
Philadelphia Eagles players
Cincinnati Bengals players